John Barnard (25 February 1885 – 22 May 1977) was a British cyclist. He competed in the tandem event at the 1908 Summer Olympics.

References

External links
 

1885 births
1977 deaths
British male cyclists
Olympic cyclists of Great Britain
Cyclists at the 1908 Summer Olympics
People from Devizes